This is a list of all the United States Supreme Court cases from volume 498 of the United States Reports:

External links

1990 in United States case law
1991 in United States case law